Shahab al Din Sulaiman shah (d. February 1258 AD) was a Kurdish governor of Kurdistan and an Abbasid officer who was promoted to commander in chief of the Caliphate army following the Battle of Anbar.

He convinced the Caliph not to surrender to the Mongols. The caliph commissioned him to defend the city. However, the city fell to the Mongols and in February 1258 Hulagu executed Sulaiman Shah along with 600 of his followers.

Abbasid and Mongol war
Hulagu sent word to Al-Musta'sim, demanding his acquiescence to the terms imposed by Möngke. Al-Musta'sim refused, in large part due to the influence of his advisor and grand vizier, Ibn al-Alkami. Historians have ascribed various motives to al-Alkami's opposition to submission, including treachery and incompetence, and it appears that he lied to the Caliph about the severity of the invasion, assuring al-Musta'sim that, if the capital of the Caliphate was endangered by a Mongol army, the Islamic world would rush to its aid.

Although he replied to Hulagu's demands in a manner that the Mongol commander found menacing and offensive enough to break off further negotiation, Al-Musta'sim neglected to summon armies to reinforce the troops at his disposal in Baghdad. Nor did he strengthen the city's walls. By January 11 the Mongols were close to the city, establishing themselves on both banks of the Tigris River so as to form a pincer around the city. Al-Musta'sim finally decided to do battle with them and sent out a force of 20,000 cavalry to attack the Mongols. The cavalry were decisively defeated by the Mongols, whose sappers breached dikes along the Tigris River and flooded the ground behind the Abbasid forces, trapping them.

The Abbasid Caliphate could supposedly call upon 50,000 soldiers for the defense of their capital, including the 20,000 cavalry under al-Musta'sim. However, these troops were assembled hastily, making them poorly equipped and disciplined. Although the Caliph technically had the authority to summon soldiers from other Sultanates (Caliphate's deputy states) to defence, he neglected to do so. His taunting opposition had lost him the loyalty of the Mamluks, and the Syrian emirs, who he supported, were busy preparing their own defenses.

On January 29, the Mongol army began its siege of Baghdad, constructing a palisade and a ditch around the city. Employing siege engines and catapults, the Mongols attempted to breach the city's walls, and, by February 5, had seized a significant portion of the defenses. Realizing that his forces had little chance of retaking the walls, Al-Musta'sim attempted to open negotiations with Hulagu, who rebuffed the Caliph. Around 3,000 of Baghdad's notables also tried to negotiate with Hulagu but were murdered. Five days later, on February 10, the city surrendered, but the Mongols did not enter the city until the 13th, beginning a week of massacre and destruction.

See also 
 Mongol invasions of the Levant
 Tekuder son of Hulagu and a Muslim ruler.
 Berke Muslim Mongolian ruler.

References

1258 deaths
13th-century people from the Abbasid Caliphate
Kurdish rulers
Year of birth unknown
13th-century Kurdish people